Motor Coach Industries (MCI) is a North American multinational bus manufacturer, specializing in production of motorcoaches.  Best known for coaches produced for intercity transit and commuter buses, MCI produces coaches for a variety of applications, ranging from tour buses to prison buses.

Currently, MCI is headquartered in Des Plaines, Illinois. Since 2015, it has been a subsidiary of Canadian bus manufacturer NFI Group, the parent company of New Flyer Industries.

History 

The company was incorporated in 1933 by Harry Zoltok as Fort Garry Motor Body and Paint Works Limited, in Winnipeg, Manitoba, Canada. In 1948, Greyhound Lines of Canada, at that time MCI's major customer, became a majority shareholder when it purchased 65 percent of the company. MCI was purchased outright by Greyhound Lines in 1958.  In 1963 a new plant was opened in Pembina, North Dakota, to increase capacity as MCI began to expand into the U.S. market, while Greyhound widened its operations and switched increasingly from GMC to its own in-house products. In 1974 another plant was opened in Roswell, New Mexico, under the title Transportation Manufacturing Corporation (TMC).

In December 1986, Greyhound was split, with Greyhound Lines being sold to an investor group, and Greyhound Lines of Canada, MCI and TMC remaining part of The Greyhound Corporation, which was renamed Dial, Inc. in 1991.

In 1987, Greyhound Corporation bought the transit bus manufacturing operations of General Motors Diesel Division (GMC), which was based in Canada. (GM phased out intercity and transit bus construction at the large GMC Coach and Truck plant in Pontiac, Michigan, shifting medium duty school bus chassis production to Janesville, Wisconsin.)

MCI also took over production of GM's RTS model, transferring production to TMC. MCI also purchased the GM bus assembly plant in Saint-Eustache, Quebec, which then produced GM's Canadian transit bus model, the Classic. TMC ceased production of the older MCI vehicles in 1990 to concentrate on manufacturing the RTS, and on the "A-Model" intercity coaches.

In 1993 MCI became an independent corporation, Motor Coach Industries International Inc.

1994 acquisition 

In 1994, MCI stocks were purchased by Mexican DINA S.A., which had a long history of bus building and developed their HTQ proprietary technology (valued at 70 million dollars) that culminated with the creation of the Viaggio Confort Bus Line. MCI reproduced its Viaggio 1000 DOT for sale to the United States and Canada, and in late 1999/2000 the G4100, G4500 and F3500 models were released to the United States and to the Canadian markets. Production of the G4500 later moved to Winnipeg, after the G4100 was discontinued. Poor reliability of the G4500 resulted in very low sales after Greyhound Lines filed a lawsuit against MCI over the various issues with the bus. Greyhound took delivery of very few Winnipeg-built G4500s; these were later retired and sold. Related to a major contract cancellation by Western Star, DINA S.A. sold a great portion of its previously acquired MCI shares to Joseph Littlejohn & Levy.

In 1994 TMC, including production rights for the RTS, was sold to NovaBus. In 1997 MCI purchased the rights from the bankrupt Flxible to produce the Flxible Metro and all related parts for it. After a period of waning product demand, increased competition and lay-offs in the early 2000s, production at MCI plants in Winnipeg and Pembina increased in 2006, and 130 employees were added.

During the late 1990s and early 2000s, MCI consolidated its operations, the Winnipeg site was expanded and modernized. DINA S.A. purchased North American Symix and opened an assembly plant in Buenos Aires, Argentina and the DIMEX and DINAIR companies. A new coach finishing and paint facility and customer delivery centre were constructed on the site. At the same time, a seven-year contract was signed with the IAM union local. This agreement contained cost improvements and production operations flexibility to improve the productivity and competitiveness of the manufacturing and assembly operations.

The buses, especially the older MC-8 and workhorse MC-9 models of the 1980s, became the standard for interstate travel for many bus companies. Those particular buses featured metal frames and roof supports, metal panels on the sides and were extremely durable and reliable. Many of the buses, having survived millions of miles of commercial use, had a second career serving churches or other organizations, while the MCI/TMC coaches were popular "conversion shells", used for motorhomes.

2008 bankruptcy 

Motor Coach Industries Inc. announced on September 15, 2008, the company had filed for Chapter 11 bankruptcy protection as part of a restructuring the company said would "help shed hundreds of millions of dollars of debt".

On April 17, 2009, Motor Coach Industries Inc. emerged from its voluntary Chapter 11 reorganization. MCI and its subsidiaries became wholly owned by KPS Capital Partners, LP. KPS Capital Partners, LP is the Manager of the KPS Special Situations Funds, a family of private equity limited partnerships with over $2.6 billion of committed capital focused on constructive investing in restructurings, turnarounds, and other special situations.

Partnership with Daimler AG 

Motor Coach Industries announced on April 25, 2012, that it had reached a deal with German vehicle manufacturer Daimler AG to distribute its Setra brand of motorcoaches for the North American market. The agreement came as Daimler reconfigured its commercial bus operations in North America, also selling off its Orion brand of transit buses to New Flyer Industries.

Under the agreement, Setra would build its S407 and S417 motorcoaches in Germany and ship them to North America, where MCI would sell and service the coaches using its existing dealer network. In exchange, Daimler would purchase a 10 percent share in Motor Coach Industries.

The relationship between competitors was less than ideal. Daimler complained that MCI focused on its own motorcoaches, and did not allow for sufficient attention to the Setra brand.

The deal came to an end on January 4, 2018, with Daimler signing a new distribution rights agreement with REV Group, a U.S.-based specialty vehicle manufacturer. Sales of new motorcoaches transferred immediately, followed by the service agreement in mid-2018.

2015 acquisition 

On November 10, 2015, it was announced that Canadian bus manufacturer New Flyer Industries had agreed to acquire Motor Coach Industries, Inc. for C$604 million (approximately US$459 million). The deal closed in December 2015.

Operating subsidiaries
Motor Coach Industries, Ltd. – Canadian manufacturing facility, located in Winnipeg, Manitoba
Motor Coach Industries, Inc. – U.S. manufacturing facility, located in Pembina, North Dakota (this factory will be closed in late 2022)
MCI Sales and Service, Inc. – U.S. new and used coach sales division
MCI Service Parts – aftermarket parts sales division of the company, based in Des Plaines, Illinois, with its distribution center located in Louisville, Kentucky, with close access to the international UPS distribution center
MCI Financial Services – coach financing division, based in Dallas, Texas

Models 

After the Courier and MC model name schemes, MCI adopted an alphanumerical system for naming the different series of coaches. Two different systems have been used:

For Example, a wheelchair-lift equipped, 45-foot, diesel powered, D-Series with fluted stainless steel sides from 1997 would be designated a 102-DLW3SS. A 45-foot, battery-electric powered J-Series from 2020 would be designated a J4500 CHARGE. Not all possible combinations of models, lengths, and powertrains are made.

Current
Motor Coach Industries currently produces two different product lines.

Past

Letter series (post-1985)

MC series (1958–1998)
These models bore the MC-number designation.

Courier series (pre-1960)

Transit (all discontinued)

See also

References

External links

 
1933 establishments in Manitoba
1994 mergers and acquisitions
2015 mergers and acquisitions
American subsidiaries of foreign companies
Companies based in Cook County, Illinois
Companies that filed for Chapter 11 bankruptcy in 2008
Des Plaines, Illinois
Hybrid electric bus manufacturers
Manufacturing companies based in Winnipeg
Motor vehicle assembly plants in Canada
Motor vehicle manufacturers based in Illinois
Pembina County, North Dakota
Vehicle manufacturing companies established in 1933